Tetraconodon was an extinct genus of even-toed ungulates that existed during the middle and late Miocene in Asia (India, Pakistan, Thailand, Myanmar).

Description
The last two pairs of premolars of Tetraconodon were extremely large, while the first two premolars were small, a unique characteristic of tetraconodontinae not found in other suids.

Tetraconodon magnum was largest species, while T. malensis is the smallest. Originally known from only the oversized premolars, T. magnum was once believed to have reached sizes comparable to that of a hippopotamus or rhinoceros. Once more material was recovered, such size estimates were invalidated, but it was nonetheless a large suid.

References

Prehistoric Suidae
Miocene mammals of Asia
Miocene even-toed ungulates
Prehistoric even-toed ungulate genera